Preoperative rehabilitation, prehabilitation or prehab, is a form of healthcare intervention that takes place before a medical or surgical intervention with the aim to reduce side effects and complications, and enhance recovery. Multidisciplinary team involvement can range from physiotherapists, occupational therapists, respiratory therapists, doctors, pharmacologists, anesthesiologists, psychologists, psychiatrists and sports physiologists.

Prehab can be applied to surgical populations in oncology, cardiorespiratory, cardiovascular and orthopaedic settings. The intention is that increasing baseline fitness prior to surgery will allow for relatively higher fitness post-operatively. Prehabilitation interventions are tailored to the patient so that even those with high amounts of comorbidities can receive a positive outcome. Research evidence is mixed, but suggests that prehabilitation reduces hospital stays and therefore risk of hospital acquired infections such as pneumonia.

Prehab is also being considered for use in some cardiovascular interventions, and may also be of some benefit for preventing lung complications, such as pulmonary atelectasis, in general surgery.

Research 
In 2013, a pilot study of prehabilitation in colorectal surgery found that it improved postoperative functional recovery, measured in terms of the walking capacity at 4 weeks and 8 weeks (although the time in hospital and post-operative complications were similar).

According to a 2020 study looking at men awaiting surgery for urological cancer, high-intensity interval training (HIIT) may improve heart and lung fitness within a month before their surgery.

References

Physical exercise

Surgery
Cancer treatments